"Vanilla Sky" is a song written and recorded by Paul McCartney for the 2001 film of the same name.

Composition and recording
McCartney was in Los Angeles working on his album Driving Rain when director Cameron Crowe came by to ask if he would write a song for his new movie.
He showed us about a half-hour of and they look very intriguing with Tom [Cruise] acting his heart out. I said “What’s the title?”. He said “Vanilla Sky”. I said “Oh, that’s the nice title” and immediately you start thinking or rhymes with sky- fly… You know, it starts to kick off into something doesn’t look too difficult.

- Paul McCartney
The ex-Beatle says he got inspiration from a waiter in a restaurant:
Before the first course he brought something we hadn’t ordered. He said “Here’s amuse-bouche”. I said “What is he talking about? Music bushi?”. My limited knowledge of French I kind of worked out that he meant like a sort of palate pleaser or something. So that became the first line of the song- “The chef prepares a special menu”. It’s gonna be “The chef prepares amuse-bouche”, but I never even pronounce that well I work in the song.
It only took Paul about a week to finish the track:
I just recorded it and had Cameron over and said “What do you think of this?”. He said “I love it”.

Release
The song was nominated for a Golden Globe Award for Best Original Song, for an Academy Award for Best Original Song and for a Critics' Choice Movie Award for Best Song, winning the latter.

A live version of the song is featured on the 2002 live album Back in the U.S..

References

Paul McCartney songs
2001 singles
2001 songs
Songs written by Paul McCartney